Vad is a locality situated in Smedjebacken Municipality, Dalarna County, Sweden, with 308 inhabitants in 2010.

References 

Populated places in Dalarna County
Populated places in Smedjebacken Municipality